

Pharmacology 
25CN-NBOH (sometimes also referred to as NBOH-2C-CN) is a compound indirectly derived from the phenethylamine series of hallucinogens, which was discovered in 2014 by a group of researchers at the University of Copenhagen. This compound is notable as one of the most selective agonist ligands for the 5-HT2A receptor yet discovered, with a pKi of 8.88 at the human 5-HT2A receptor and with 100x selectivity for 5-HT2A over 5-HT2C, and 46x selectivity for 5-HT2A over 5-HT2B. A tritiated version of 25CN-NBOH has also been accessed and used for more detailed investigations of the binding to 5-HT2 receptors and autoradiography.

25CN-NBOH is listed at chemicalprobes.org, where more information abouts its uses is listed.

Structure 
The structure of 25CN-NBOH in complex with an engineered Gαq heterotrimer of the 5-HT2AR has been determined by cryoelectron microscopy (cryo-EM), showing a distinct binding mode when compared to LSD.

Synthesis 
25CN-NBOH is readily available from 2C-H in 57% over 4 steps.

Animal studies
25CN-NBOH was found to partially substitute for DOI but was considerably weaker at inducing a head-twitch response in mice. Another in vivo evaluation of 25CN-NBOH concluded that "Given its distinct in vitro selectivity for 5-HT2A over non 5-HT2 receptors and its behavioral dynamics, 25CN-NBOH appears to be a powerful tool for dissection of receptor-specific cortical circuit dynamics, including 5-HT2A related psychoactivity." Additional in vivo investigations with this ligand is emerging. Chronic administration in mice lead to desensitization of the 5-HT2AR (measured via HTR) and increased startle amplitude whereas it does not effect reversal learning in mice. 25CN-NBOH was shown to increase the production of CTGF in chondrocytes. In rats, 25CN-NBOH induce a reduction in conditioned fear that was countered by pretreatment with 5-HT2AR inverse agonist MDL100907.

A bioanalytical method for the detection of 25CN-NBOH has been developed.

Literature 
A review covering the literature up to 2020 was published in 2021.

Related compounds
The tendency of the 4-cyano substitution to confer high 5-HT2A selectivity had previously been observed with DOCN, but this was not sufficiently potent to be widely adopted as a research ligand. 25CN-NBOH is still slightly less selective for 5-HT2A than the more complex cyclised derivative 2S,6S-DMBMPP ((2S,6S)-2-(2,5-dimethoxy-4-bromobenzyl)-6-(2-methoxyphenyl)piperidine), in binding assays, however it is also less complex to synthesise and has higher efficacy and selectivity in functional assays as a partial agonist of the 5-HT2A receptor.

Legality

Hungary
25CN-NBOH is illegal in Hungary.

United Kingdom

See also
 25B-NBOH
 25C-NBOH (NBOH-2CC)
 25I-NBOH (NBOH-2CI)

References

25-NB (psychedelics)
5-HT2A agonists